Ashajipora, also known as Ashajipur, is a neighborhood located in Anantnag district, Jammu and Kashmir, India. It is the hub of 
industrial training institute.

Anantnag district